Panola may refer to:

 Panola, Crenshaw County, Alabama, an unincorporated community in Crenshaw County
 Panola, Sumter County, Alabama, a census-designated place in Sumter County
 Panola County, Mississippi
 Panola County, Texas
 Panola, Illinois
 Panola, Michigan
 Panola, Oklahoma
 Panola, Texas